Negin Amiripour (born 26 August 1985) is an Iranian badminton player.

Achievements

BWF International Challenge/Series (6 titles, 9 runners-up) 
Women's singles

Women's doubles

  BWF International Challenge tournament
  BWF International Series tournament
  BWF Future Series tournament

References

External links 
 

1985 births
Living people
Sportspeople from Tehran
Iranian female badminton players
20th-century Iranian women
21st-century Iranian women